The 1905–06 season was Blackpool F.C.'s ninth season (sixth consecutive) in the Football League. They competed in the twenty-team Division Two, then the second tier of English football, finishing fourteenth.

The club's league top-scorer accolade was a three-way tie between new signings Jimmy Connor, Harry Hancock and E. Francis, with six apiece. Hancock became the outright top scorer after his three goals during Blackpool's FA Cup run.

Charles Ramsden became Blackpool's chairman during the close season.

Season synopsis
After an opening-day victory at home to Burton Albion, Blackpool mustered only three more wins before the end of the year.

1906 proved slightly more fruitful, with full points achieved over Gainsborough, Glossop, Grimsby Town, Lincoln City, Burslem Port Vale and — to close the season out — at Clapton Orient, which ultimately lifted them five places to 14th.

In the FA Cup, it took three attempts to beat Crystal Palace in the First Round. After overcoming Sheffield United in the next round, they were knocked out with a 5–0 defeat to Newcastle United at St. James' Park.

Table

Player statistics

Appearances

League
Arthur Hull – 38 
Edward Threlfall – 37
Jack Parkinson – 37
 Jack Scott – 35
Jimmy Connor – 33
Harry Hancock – 27
Sam Johnson – 25
Teddy Duckworth – 24
J. Gow – 20
Bob Birket – 20
Thomas Bate – 20
Luke Raisbeck – 15
E. Francis – 14
Bob Crewdson – 13
Charles Bennett – 12
J. Lavery – 11
J. Hollingworth – 10
W. Lowe – 6
E. Darlington – 4
C. Musgrove – 4
Robert Topping – 3
Albert Brown – 3
C. Sanderson – 2
William Anderton – 2
Levi Copestake – 2
James Reilly – 1
John Jones – 1

Players used: 27

FA Cup
Jimmy Connor – 5
E. Francis – 5
Harry Hancock – 5
Arthur Hull – 5
Sam Johnson – 5
Jack Parkinson – 5
 Jack Scott – 5
Edward Threlfall – 5
Teddy Duckworth – 4
J. Gow – 4
Bob Birkett – 3
Bob Crewdson – 2
Thomas Bate – 1
J. Hollingworth – 1

Players used: 14

Goals

League
Jimmy Connor – 6
Harry Hancock – 6
E. Francis – 6
Charles Bennett – 4
Bob Birkett – 3
Teddy Duckworth – 2
J. Gow – 2
J. Lavery – 2
Thomas Bate – 1
Sam Johnson – 1
Jack Parkinson – 1
C. Sanderson – 1
 Jack Scott – 1
Edward Threlfall – 1

League goals scored: 37

FA Cup
Harry Hancock – 3
E. Francis – 1
Edward Threlfall – 1

FA Cup goals scored: 5

Transfers

In

Out
The following players left after the final game of the previous season:

Notes

References

Blackpool F.C.
Blackpool F.C. seasons